Katrina Parker is a pop singer based in Hollywood, Los Angeles.

The Voice
Parker was a contestant in the second season of The Voice, and came in at second place on Adam Levine's team. She would have reached the show finals based on viewer's votes, but Levine chose to give 60 points to Tony Lucca and 40 points to Parker, which gave Lucca 16 more total points.

Post-The Voice
Parker funded her debut album In & Out of the Dark through Kickstarter, reaching the funding goal on February 16, 2013. The album's lead single of the same name was released on August 13, 2013, followed by the album's release on September 10, 2013. Parker is releasing her sophomore album, "Stars", on September 6, 2019. Leading up to the release she released four singles: the title track, "Stars" on July 9, 2019, the only cover on the album, "Ring of Fire" on July 23, 2019, "Follow Me" on August 6, 2019, and "Don't Give It Up" on August 20, 2019, which premiered on Billboard.com.

Discography
Only Dreaming (2005)
In and Out of the Dark (2013)
Stars (2019)

Singles

References

Living people
21st-century American women singers
American women rock singers
American women pop singers
Singers from Los Angeles
People from Hollywood, Los Angeles
People from Onslow County, North Carolina
The Voice (franchise) contestants
Year of birth missing (living people)
21st-century American singers